Unhinged is a 1982 American slasher film directed by Don Gronquist, written by Gronquist and Reagan Ramsey, and starring Laurel Munson and Janet Penner. The film follows three young women who, after suffering a car accident, are taken in by a mysterious family at their rural Pacific Northwest mansion, where they are subsequently stalked by a violent murderer.

Gronquist produced Unhinged on a modest budget of $100,000, using a cast and crew made up of various locals in the Portland, Oregon area. Filming took place at the Pittock Mansion, whose interiors were used only at night due to the estate's operation as a museum during the daytime. Additional photography took place in St. Johns and Forest Park. Gus Van Sant served as a location scout for the production.

Unhinged was released directly-to-video in the United Kingdom on June 21, 1983 by CBS/Fox, and subsequently appeared on the list of the United Kingdom's 72 "video nasties," which led to an expanded role for the British Board of Film Classification. In the United States, it screened at the Northwest Film & Video Festival in Portland on August 20, 1983.

Though the film received little critical attention at the time of its release, it has been subject to various retrospective reviews and reassessment that vary in reception. The film has also been the topic of scholarly discussion due to its depictions of repression and gender dysphoria in its villain, and has also drawn comparisons to Alfred Hitchcock's Psycho (1960). A remake was made in England and released in 2017.

Plot
Three female college students, Terry, Nancy and Gloria, embark for a music festival in rural Washington. A sudden storm causes Nancy to accidentally crash the car, rendering all three unconscious. Terry awakes to find her and her friends alive, sheltered in a large mansion in the middle of nowhere, owned by the Penroses: the middle-aged Marion, her mother, and their groundskeeper, Norman. Gloria is the only one with serious injuries, so Marion suggests that they spend the night until Gloria is able to leave. Terry and Nancy are invited to dinner with Marion and her elderly, senile crippled mother. Throughout dinner, Marion's mother rants and raves, espousing her misandrist views, and recounts how her husband left her for another woman. She also recurrently accuses Marion of bringing men into the home. Later, while the women relax in the parlour, a mysterious man looks menacingly into the windows at them.

Later that night, Terry finds a human tooth under her bed and subsequently awakes to the sound of a man breathing heavily upstairs. In the morning, Terry and Nancy take a shower, while someone spies on them through a peephole in the wall. Later that day, Nancy elects to walk to the local village alone, and starts off through the woods. When she arrives at a rural country road, she is attacked by a cloaked figure with a long scythe, who slashes her to death. That evening at dinner,  Mrs. Penrose continues to ramble about her disgust for men and harangue Marion, while Terry worries about Nancy's absence. Alone in her bedroom, Terry once again hears the breathing and goes to investigate. She searches the attic, where she finds black and white pictures of two children, and an old tool belt with a dusty handgun and machete. She goes back downstairs and sees the man staring in at her through the window, and runs screaming through the house. Marion calms her down and reveals to her that the man is Carl, her developmentally-disabled younger brother. She insists that he is harmless, and Terry goes back to bed.

The next day, Terry goes outside to talk to Norman and asks if he has seen Nancy. Norman reveals that he never spoke with her, and instead tells her a confusing story about two teenage girls who recently disappeared in the woods. At nightfall, Gloria regains her consciousness, and Terry tells her she feels the two need to leave as soon as possible. After Terry leaves the room, an unseen figure attacks a sleeping Gloria, plunging an axe through her head. Later in the evening, Terry finds Gloria's room empty and asks Marion where she is. Marion suggests she may have gone outside for a breath of fresh air. As she steps outside, Terry is attacked and chased by Carl. She hides in a shed, where she discovers the dead bodies of her friends along with several other dismembered corpses. Carl breaks through the window and tries to grab her, but she manages to escape from the shed and runs back to the house as Carl chases after her.

Hurrying into the attic, Terry obtains the handgun and shoots Carl in the head, killing him. Marion rushes upstairs after hearing the struggle, and chastises Terry for killing her brother. Terry responds by ordering Marion to search the shed. After a moment of silence, Marion, speaking with in a deep, masculine register, tells her that Carl had nothing to do with the corpses in the shed. Terry confusedly looks at Marion, who pulls out a machete. Marion reveals that she was actually Mrs. Penrose's second son, and Carl's younger biological brother, who dresses and presents as a woman. Terry attempts to flee, but Marion knocks her to the ground and maniacally stabs her to death whilst raving about the pressures of her gender dysphoria, and of her obligations to care for her brother and mother. As Terry bleeds to death on the floor, Mrs. Penrose calls for Marion from downstairs, asking if there is a man up there. Marion, covered in blood, responds in her feminine voice: "No, mother."

Cast

Analysis

Unhinged has been noted by some film scholars for its dealing with themes of repression and gender dysphoria. Robert Cettl analyzes the character of Marion, the villain who is a biological male presenting as a female: "Unhinged portrays the society of women as monstrous, perverse abhorrence which corrupts the male and, ironically, consumes itself. The killer, whose aggressive gaze is coded as masculine, considers such young women groveling, subhuman figures, and his crimes are in part expressions of the person he has been forced to become, and the gender he has been forced to adopt. It is self-hatred and gender confusion as much as it is misogyny." Cettl connects this element of the film as being inspired by Alfred Hitchcock's Psycho (1960).

Production

Casting
The cast was made up entirely of Portland locals, including stage actresses Janet Penner and Virginia Settle as Marion and Mrs. Penrose, respectively. Sara Ansley, who portrayed Nancy, was a model whom Gronquist hired through a talent agency.

Filming
With a $100,000 budget, Unhinged was filmed on location by cinematographer Richard Blakeslee at the Pittock Mansion, a 22-room French Renaissance-style château in Portland, Oregon, built in 1914. Additional photography took place in Forest Park. The film was shot from dusk through dawn, over 19 consecutive nights. Local filmmaker Gus Van Sant assisted as a location scout for the production. Because Pittock Mansion is a tourist attraction and city property, the film had to be shot overnights from 5:00 p.m. to 7:00 a.m.

The film's opening scenes feature shots of the St. Johns Bridge, and the road accident scene was filmed on NW Germantown Road near Linnton in North Portland.

Music
The film features an original score by Jonathan Newton, who later scored Shadow Play, starring Dee Wallace and Cloris Leachman.

Release
Unhinged was released directly to video in the United Kingdom on June 21, 1983, and subsequently screened on August 20, 1983, at the Northwest Film & Video Festival in Portland.

Critical response
In a retrospective review of the film, Blumhouse wrote of the film: "The main issue for most viewers is going to be the film’s rather leisurely pace; the filmmakers apparently attempted to position Unhinged as more psychological thriller than chop-em-up slasher, but instead of slowly building tension and suspense, the script frequently leaves the characters lounging around with nothing much to do except talk and sleep (both of which they do a lot). A tighter edit might have helped speed things along, but considering the film’s ultra-lean runtime of under 80 minutes, I’m not sure that would have even been possible."

In his book Nightmare Movies: Horror on Screen Since the 1960s, film journalist Kim Newman was critical of the film, calling it a "sickle-slicker slasher so inept that the clapperboard can twice be discerned in the grey murk during a slow fade." In Scott Aaron Stine's The Gorehound's Guide to Splatter Films of the 1980s, he writes of the film: "Although not a bad film, Unhinged is exceptionally slow; the abundance of talking heads actually slackens much of the suspense and tension the film strives to generate. And despite some wonderful plot twists—the above average shock ending is a pleasant surprise—the scriptwriting rarely rises above that of pulp horror, derivative of such films as Three on a Meathook (1973)." Jerome Reuter of Dread Central praised the film in a 2017 retrospective, noting: "While it isn’t the blood-splattered mayhem of Violent Shit, or the psychological portrait of Bill Lustig’s Maniac, it certainly deserves recognition among genre fans as an underrated gem...  Unquestionably, the greatest attribute of Unhinged is its pacing best described as a slow burn. The story builds up gradually, and unlike some of its contemporaries, it restrains itself a great deal with its content."

Censorship
Although the British Board of Film Classification had passed the film uncut for UK cinemas in 1983, the U.K. Director of Public Prosecutions retroactively banned the video release, placing Unhinged on its list of 72 "video nasties", which violated the Obscene Publications Act (as amended in 1977). Unlike other films on that list, the film's few murders were suggested (by sprays of blood) rather than explicitly depicted, and featured few scenes of nudity.

Home media
The film was released in the United Kingdom on a pre-certification VHS by CBS/Fox Video on June 21, 1983. In 1988, Lighthouse Home Video released the film on VHS in the United States.

In 2002, IndieDVD  released Unhinged on DVD in the United States. It was subsequently issued in the United Kingdom on DVD in 2004 through Platinum Home Video, uncut and with an '18' certificate. In the United States, the film received several other DVD reissues from different distributors: First in 2005 by Brentwood Home Video, and again by Code Red in 2012 as a double feature disc with Murder Run (1983), a film produced by Gronquist; this edition was limited to only 500 copies.

The film was released in a remastered DVD in the United Kingdom by 88 Films in 2014.

Remake
A remake of the film was produced in England and released in 2017.

References

Sources

External links

 
 

1982 films
1982 horror films
1982 LGBT-related films
1980s slasher films
American exploitation films
American serial killer films
American slasher films
Backwoods slasher films
Cross-dressing in film
Films about dysfunctional families
Films about sexual repression
Films about siblings
Films set in country houses
Films set in Washington (state)
Films shot in Portland, Oregon
LGBT-related horror films
Transgender-related films
Video nasties
1980s English-language films
1980s American films